Shenandoah is a city in Page and Fremont counties in Iowa, United States. The population was 4,925 at the time of the 2020 U.S. Census.  Once referred to as the "seed and nursery center of the world," Shenandoah is the home to Earl May Seed Company and the radio station KMA, founded by Earl E. May.  The early live radio stations gave many performers their start, including The Everly Brothers and Charlie Haden.

History
Shenandoah, originally known as Fair Oaks, was platted in 1870, shortly after the arrival of the Chicago, Burlington and Quincy Railroad into the neighborhood. Its name is derived from the local valley's resemblance to the Shenandoah Valley, in Virginia.

Geography
Shenandoah is located at  (40.762251, -95.370945) along Fourmile Creek near its confluence with the East Nishnabotna River.

Climate

Demographics

2010 census
At the 2010 census there were 5,150 people, 2,310 households, and 1,366 families living in the city. The racial makeup of the city was 96.4% White, 0.3% African American, 0.2% Native American, 0.5% Asian, 1.1% from other races, and 1.5% from two or more races. Hispanic or Latino of any race were 4.0%.

Of the 2,310 households 26.1% had children under the age of 18 living with them, 44.3% were married couples living together, 10.8% had a female householder with no husband present, 4.0% had a male householder with no wife present, and 40.9% were non-families. 37.0% of households were one person and 19% were one person aged 65 or older. The average household size was 2.18 and the average family size was 2.82.

The median age was 44.4 years. 22.4% of residents were under the age of 18; 6.5% were between the ages of 18 and 24; 21.5% were from 25 to 44; 26.5% were from 45 to 64; and 23% were 65 or older. The gender makeup of the city was 46.6% male and 53.4% female.

2000 census
At the 2000 census there were 5,546 people, 2,421 households, and 1,486 families living in the city. The racial makeup of the city was 97.91% White, 0.11% African American, 0.47% Native American, 0.22% Asian, 0.72% from other races, and 0.58% from two or more races. Hispanic or Latino of any race were 2.72%.

Of the 2,421 households 25.9% had children under the age of 18 living with them, 48.6% were married couples living together, 9.7% had a female householder with no husband present, and 38.6% were non-families. 34.2% of households were one person and 17.8% were one person aged 65 or older. The average household size was 2.22 and the average family size was 2.84.

Age spread:  22.4% under the age of 18, 8.2% from 18 to 24, 23.9% from 25 to 44, 22.4% from 45 to 64, and 23.1% 65 or older. The median age was 42 years. For every 100 females, there were 85.8 males. For every 100 females age 18 and over, there were 82.5 males.

The median household income was $29,435 and the median family income  was $39,110. Males had a median income of $31,657 versus $18,588 for females. The per capita income for the city was $16,301. About 11.0% of families and 15.4% of the population were below the poverty line, including 26.9% of those under age 18 and 8.0% of those age 65 or over.

Tarkio Sloths 

Recent excavations of at least three Jefferson's ground sloths, Megalonyx jeffersonii, have been coordinated by the Iowa Museum of Natural History along West Tarkio Creek near Shenandoah.

Minor league baseball
Shenandoah was home to minor league baseball. The Shenandoah Pin Rollers played as members of the Class D level Southwest Iowa League in 1903 and Missouri-Iowa-Nebraska-Kansas League (MINK) in 1910 and 1911.

Media
The Valley News is Shenandoah's community newspaper. Published twice weekly and distributed to homes throughout Page and Fremont Counties, the Valley News is the community's oldest continually-operated business. Its predecessors include the award-winning Evening Sentinel. Its website can be found at valleynewstoday.com.

The radio stations KMA AM and KFNF were early pioneering radio stations attracting listeners throughout the Mid-West and drawing thousands of visitors to the city in the 1920s.  The radio station KMA-FM 99.1 is in the same complex as KMA. Both stations share a simulcast, except for sporting events and other special programming.

Education
Shenandoah Community School District Operates Public Schools

Iowa Western Community College Shenandoah Campus

Notable people  

 James Ross Lightfoot, US Congressman (1938-Present)
 Phil Everly , rock musician (1937-2014)
 Charlie Haden, jazz musician (1937-2014)
 Gary Kellgren, founder of The Record Plant (Record Plant Studios) (1939-1977)
 Leanna Field Driftmier, long-time radio host  (1886–1976)
 Derryl McLaren, Iowa state legislator and politician (1949-Present)
 Agnes Samuelson, educator (1887-1963)
 Jay Scheib, theatre director (1969-Present)
 Jessie Field Shambaugh, founder of 4-H (1881-1971)
 Willie Leacox, America Drummer  (1947-2022)
 Earl Ernest May, founder of KMA radio and Earl May Nursery & Garden Center, (1890-1946)
 Henry Arms Field, founder of Henry Field Nursey and KFNF Radio, (1872-1949)
 Bernie Masterson, Former Chicago Bears coach, (1911-1963)
 Chip Duncan, American Filmmaker (1955-Present)
 Willis Glassgow, American football player and attorney, He played two seasons of professional football in the National Football League for the Portsmouth Spartans in 1930 and the Chicago Cardinals in 1931 (1907-1959)
 Michael J. O'Brien,  American politician in the state of Iowa, (1939-Present)
 James Pearson, Popular radio preacher of KFNF radio, (1873-1950)

See also
Women's Christian Temperance Union Public Fountain

References

External links
 Shenandoah's Chamber of Commerce Homepage
 Shenandoah Chamber of Industry Homepage 
 The Valley News, Shenandoah and world news
 KMA, News and radio

Cities in Iowa
Cities in Fremont County, Iowa
Cities in Page County, Iowa